Kirill Georgiyevich Denisov (born 25 January 1988) is a Russian judoka.

Career
He competed at the 2012 Summer Olympics in the -90 kg event and lost in the semifinals to Asley González of Cuba before losing the bronze medal match to Masashi Nishiyama of Japan. Denisov won a silver medal at the 2009 World Judo Championships, a bronze at the 2010 World Judo Championships and a silver at the 2011 European Judo Championships.

References

External links

 
 
 
 
 

1988 births
Living people
European Games bronze medalists for Russia
European Games gold medalists for Russia
European Games medalists in judo
Judoka at the 2012 Summer Olympics
Judoka at the 2016 Summer Olympics
Judoka at the 2015 European Games
Olympic judoka of Russia
People from Tryokhgorny
Russian male judoka
Sportspeople from Chelyabinsk Oblast
20th-century Russian people
21st-century Russian people